Muçum is a small town in the state of Rio Grande do Sul, Brazil.

Founded on January 31, 1959, also known as "Princesa das Pontes" (Princess of the Bridges) because of the railroad crossing Taquari river.

Settlers came to the town by Taquari river from Portugal, Italy, Germany and Poland.

See also
List of municipalities in Rio Grande do Sul

References

Municipalities in Rio Grande do Sul